Willie McCray (July 17, 1953 – January 3, 2022) was a former American football defensive end. He played for the San Francisco 49ers in 1978. He died January 3, 2022.

References

1953 births
2022 deaths
American football defensive ends
African-American players of American football
Alabama Crimson Tide football players
Troy Trojans football players
San Francisco 49ers players
People from Prince George County, Virginia